Platystoma lugubre is a species of fly in the family Platystomatidae.

Subspecies
Subspecies include:
Platystoma lugubre corsicarum Séguy, 1932 
Platystoma lugubre lugubre (Robineau-Desvoidy, 1830)

Distribution
This species is present in most of Europe and in the Near East.

Habitat
These flies mainly inhabit the edges of forests, parks, gardens, woodlands, scrubs and cemeteries.

Description

These medium-sized flies have a body mottled with greyish and yellow. The upperside of the abdomen is shiny black with two large spots of yellow gray pollonisity. The lower part of the abdomen is lemon yellow. The large eyes are reddish. Halteres are redish yellow. Legs are black. Wings are black, mottled with transparent spots.

This species is rather similar to Platystoma seminationis, but the latter is clearly smaller and quite common.

Biology
Adults feed on nectar, while the larvae are coprophagous and develop on dead vertebrates, buried corpses and decomposing plant material.

References

Platystomatidae
Muscomorph flies of Europe
Insects described in 1830
Coprophagous insects